Bellfountain is a census-designated place and unincorporated community in Benton County, Oregon, United States.  Bellfountain lies on Bellfountain Road north of Alpine and northwest of Monroe. The population was 75 at the 2010 census.

Demographics

Early history
Early on, the area around Bellfountain was known as Belknap's Settlement.  A post office was established in 1895 called Dusty.  The community's name was later changed to Bellfountain.  It was said to be named for Bellefontaine, Ohio.  From 1902 to 1905, a Bellfountain post office existed.  After 1905, local residents received their mail in Monroe.

Bellfountain has also been said to have been named for the bell fountain, a natural spring that bubbled up about 1 mile west of Bellfountain where the Bellfountain Park is located.  Flat rocks surrounding the natural artesian spring formed in the shape of a bell.  People could view the bell fountain until sometime during the last 40 years when Benton County covered over the bell fountain with a cement building and a pump house to pump the water for use in the park.  People are no longer able to view the bell fountain for which some people believe the town was named.

State Champion School
In 1937 the basketball team at Bellfountain High School won the Oregon state championship.  At this time Kenneth Litchfield was principal and Burton "Bill" Lemmon was the coach.  That was an era when all schools, large and small, were grouped together for playoff purposes.  Bellfountain H.S. had a total of twenty-seven students, and their basketball team consisted of eight boys, none over 6 feet tall.  After taking the Class B Championship they beat Portland's Franklin High School (a school of 2100 students) in the semi-finals, then competed in the finals against Portland's Lincoln High School.  The Bells beat Lincoln by 14 points - their closest game of the season.

Present-day Bellfountain
The local economy is centered on the farming of Christmas trees and grass seed, and on logging.

The people of Benton County have been using Bellfountain Park for over 100 years. The park has a large barbeque pit, softball field, sand volleyball court, horseshoe pits, and restrooms. There is also a covered picnic shelter with a kitchen area and one of the longest picnic tables in the world.

References

External links
 Oregon Hoop History
 Benton County Place Names
 Eugene Weekly
 Eugene Register-Guard
 Bellfountain - Our Town

Unincorporated communities in Benton County, Oregon
Census-designated places in Oregon
1895 establishments in Oregon
Populated places established in 1895
Census-designated places in Benton County, Oregon
Unincorporated communities in Oregon